Malawian Sign Language is the language of the deaf community of Malawi.

References

Sign languages
Languages of Malawi